A prolactinoma is a tumor (adenoma) of the pituitary gland that produces the hormone prolactin. It is the most common type of functioning pituitary tumor. Symptoms of prolactinoma are due to abnormally high levels of prolactin in the blood (hyperprolactinemia), or due to pressure of the tumor on surrounding tissues. Based on size, a prolactinoma can be classified as a microprolactinoma (<10 mm diameter) or a macroprolactinoma (>10 mm diameter).

Signs and symptoms 

The symptoms due to a prolactinoma are broadly divided into those that are caused by increased prolactin levels or mass effect.

Those that are caused by increased prolactin levels are:
 Amenorrhea (disappearance of ovulation periods)
 Galactorrhea (Milk production; infrequent in men)
 Loss of axillary and pubic hair
 Hypogonadism (Reduced function of the gonads.)
 Gynecomastia (an increase in male breast size)
 Erectile dysfunction (in males)

Those that are caused by mass effect are:
 Headaches
 Vision Changes-visual field deficits, blurred vision, decreased visual acuity
 Cranial nerve palsies-especially with invasive tumors or with pituitary apoplexy
 Seizures, Hydrocephalus, Unilateral exophthalmos are rare presentations
 Hypopituitarism 
 Pituitary apoplexy is a medical emergency because of spontaneous hemorrhage into the pituitary tumor and presents with severe headaches, vision changes, and acute panhypopituitarism.

Causes 
The cause of pituitary tumors remains unknown. Though most pituitary tumors are sporadic, some genetic syndromes include increased risk for pituitary adenomas including Multiple endocrine neoplasia type 1 (caused by a mutation in the MEN1 gene) and Familial isolated pituitary adenoma (FIPA).

The majority of moderately raised prolactin levels (up to 5000 mIU/L) are not due to microprolactinomas but other causes. The effects of some prescription drugs are the most common. Other causes are other pituitary tumours and normal pregnancy and breastfeeding. This is discussed more under hyperprolactinaemia.

The xenoestrogenic chemical Bisphenol-A has been shown to lead to hyperprolactinaemia and growth of prolactin-producing pituitary cells. The increasing and prolonged exposure of Bisphenol-A from childhood on, may contribute to the growth of a Prolactinoma.

Diagnosis 
A doctor will test for prolactin blood levels in women with unexplained milk secretion (galactorrhea) or irregular menses or infertility, and in men with impaired sexual function and, in rare cases, milk secretion. If prolactin is high, a doctor will test thyroid function and ask first about other conditions and medications known to raise prolactin secretion. The doctor will also request a magnetic resonance imaging (MRI), which is the most sensitive test for detecting pituitary tumors and determining their size. MRI scans may be repeated periodically to assess tumor progression and the effects of therapy. Computed Tomography (CT scan) also gives an image of the pituitary, but it is less sensitive than the MRI.

In addition to assessing the size of the pituitary tumor, doctors also look for damage to surrounding tissues and perform tests to assess whether production of other pituitary hormones is normal. Depending on the size of the tumor, the doctor may request an eye exam with measurement of visual fields.

Treatments 
The goal of treatment is to return prolactin secretion to normal, reduce tumor size, correct any visual abnormalities, and restore normal pituitary function. As mentioned above, the impact of stress should be ruled out before the diagnosis of prolactinoma is given.  Exercise can significantly reduce stress and, thereby, prolactin levels.  In the case of very large tumors, only partial reduction of the prolactin levels may be possible.

Medications 
Dopamine is the chemical that normally inhibits prolactin secretion, so clinicians may treat prolactinoma with drugs that act like dopamine such as bromocriptine and cabergoline. This type of drug is called a dopamine agonist. These drugs shrink the tumor and return prolactin levels to normal in approximately 80% of patients. Both bromocriptine and cabergoline have been approved by the Food and Drug Administration for the treatment of hyperprolactinemia. Bromocriptine is associated with side-effects such as nausea and dizziness and hypotension in patients with already low blood pressure readings. To avoid these side-effects, it is important for bromocriptine treatment to start slowly.

Bromocriptine treatment should not be interrupted without consulting a qualified endocrinologist. Prolactin levels often rise again in most people when the drug is discontinued. In some, however, prolactin levels remain normal, so the doctor may suggest reducing or discontinuing treatment every two years on a trial basis. Recent studies have shown increased success in remission of prolactin levels after discontinuation, in patients having been treated for at least 2 years prior to cessation of bromocriptine treatment.

Cabergoline is also associated with side effects such as nausea and dizziness, but these may be less common and less severe than with bromocriptine. However, people with low blood pressure should use caution when starting cabergoline treatment, as the long half-life of the drug (4–7 days) may inadvertently affect their ability to keep their blood pressure within normal limits, creating intense discomfort, dizziness, and even fainting upon standing and walking until the single first dose clears from their system. As with bromocriptine therapy, side effects may be avoided or minimized if treatment is started slowly. If a patient's prolactin level remains normal for 6 months, a doctor may consider stopping treatment. Cabergoline should not be interrupted without consulting a qualified endocrinologist.

Other dopamine agonists that have been used less commonly to suppress prolactin include dihydroergocryptine, ergoloid, lisuride, metergoline, pergolide, quinagolide, and terguride.

Surgery 
Surgery should be considered if medical therapy cannot be tolerated or if it fails to reduce prolactin levels, restore normal reproduction and pituitary function, and reduce tumor size.  If medical therapy is only partially successful, this therapy should continue, possibly combined with surgery or radiation treatment.

The results of surgery depend a great deal on tumor size and prolactin level.  The higher the prolactin level the lower the chance of normalizing serum prolactin.  In the best medical centers, surgery corrects prolactin levels in 80% of patients with a serum prolactin less than 250 ng/ml. Even in patients with large tumors that cannot be completely removed, drug therapy may be able to return serum prolactin to the normal range after surgery.  Depending on the size of the tumor and how much of it is removed, studies show that 20 to 50% will recur, usually within five years.

Prognosis 
People with microprolactinoma generally have an excellent prognosis.  In 95% of cases, the tumor will not show any signs of growth after a 4 to 6-year period.

Macroprolactinomas often require more aggressive treatment otherwise they may continue to grow.  There is no way to reliably predict the rate of growth, as it is different for every individual.  Regular monitoring by a specialist to detect any major changes in the tumor is recommended.

Osteoporosis risk 
Hyperprolactinemia can cause reduced estrogen production in women and reduced testosterone production in men.  Although estrogen/testosterone production may be restored after treatment for hyperprolactinemia, even a year or two without estrogen/testosterone can compromise bone strength, and patients should protect themselves from osteoporosis by increasing exercise and calcium intake through diet or supplementation, and by avoiding smoking. Patients may want to have bone density measurements to assess the effect of estrogen/testosterone deficiency on bone density. They may also want to discuss testosterone/estrogen replacement therapy with their physician.

Pregnancy and oral birth control 
If a woman has one or more small prolactinoma, there is no reason that she cannot conceive and have a normal pregnancy after successful medical therapy. The pituitary enlarges and prolactin production increases during normal pregnancy in women without pituitary disorders. Women with prolactin-secreting tumors may experience further pituitary enlargement and must be closely monitored during pregnancy. However, damage to the pituitary or eye nerves occurs in less than one percent of pregnant women with prolactinoma. In women with large tumors, the risk of damage to the pituitary or eye nerves is greater, and some doctors consider it as high as 25%. If a woman has completed a successful pregnancy, the chances of her completing further successful pregnancies are extremely high.

A woman with a prolactinoma should discuss her plans to conceive with her physician, so she can be carefully evaluated prior to becoming pregnant. This evaluation will include a magnetic resonance imaging (MRI) scan to assess the size of the tumor and an eye examination with measurement of visual fields. As soon as a patient is pregnant, her doctor will usually advise that she stop taking bromocriptine or cabergoline, the common treatments for prolactinoma. Most endocrinologists see patients every two months throughout the pregnancy. The patient should consult her endocrinologist promptly if she develops symptoms — in particular, headaches, visual changes, nausea, vomiting, excessive thirst or urination, or extreme lethargy. Bromocriptine or cabergoline treatment may be renewed and additional treatment may be required if the patient develops symptoms from growth of the tumor during pregnancy.

At one time, oral contraceptives were thought to contribute to the development of prolactinomas. However, this is no longer thought to be true. Patients with prolactinoma treated with bromocriptine or cabergoline may also take oral contraceptives. Likewise, post-menopausal estrogen replacement is safe in patients with prolactinoma treated with medical therapy or surgery.

Epidemiology 
Autopsy studies indicate that 6-25% of the U. S. population have small pituitary tumors. Forty percent of these pituitary tumors produce prolactin, but most are not considered clinically significant. Clinically significant pituitary tumors affect the health of approximately 14 out of 100,000 people. In non-selective surgical series, this tumor accounts for approximately 25-30% of all pituitary adenomas. Some growth hormone (GH)–producing tumors also co-secrete prolactin. More than 90% of prolactinoma is microprolactinomas, which are much more common than macroprolactinomas.

See also
 Hypothalamic–pituitary–prolactin axis
 Hyperprolactinaemia

References 

 Adapted from Prolactinoma. U. S. National Institutes of Health Publication No. 02-3924 June 2002. Public Domain Source

External links 
 

Endocrine neoplasia
Amyloidosis